The Momi-class destroyers were a class of twenty-one second-class destroyers of the Imperial Japanese Navy. All were named for plants. Obsolete by the beginning of the Pacific War, the Momis were relegated to mostly secondary roles, with some vessels serving throughout the war as patrol vessels or high speed transports.

Background
Construction of the medium-sized Momi-class destroyers was authorized as part of the Imperial Japanese Navy's 8-4 Fleet Program from fiscal 1918–1920, as an accompaniment to the larger  with which they shared many common design characteristics. These vessels were produced at several shipyards around Japan, and when formed into attack squadrons of two to four vessels, made up the backbone of the inter-war Imperial Japanese Navy.

The final seven vessels planned for this series were cancelled, and re-ordered as the new s in 1919, and by the mid-1920s the concept of the "second-class destroyer" had fallen out of favor due to the greater capabilities offered by the new generation of fleet destroyers.

Initial design
The Momi class was a development of the  second-class destroyers, relying on the same basic hull. They were quite small, comparable to Royal Navy corvettes. The design incorporated features discovered on German destroyers awarded as reparations from World War I, including a lengthened forecastle with a break forming a well deck immediately forward of the bridge, and a front gun battery placed on a pedestal on the centerline so that it could be operated in heavy weather. This arrangement also offered the advantage of a low, semi protected area for the forward torpedo tubes albeit at the cost of becoming awash in heavy seas. Initial problems with stability during high-speed turns were later corrected by widening the beam and bringing up the waterline.

In addition, fuel capacity was lowered to 275 tons of oil fuel.

As gear turbine technology was not yet perfected, the navy experimented with a variety of power plants on the Momi class:

The Momi class was heavily armed for its small displacement, with a main battery of Type 3 120 mm 45 caliber naval guns, the same as was used on the Minekaze-class, and a set of double torpedo launchers. Anti-aircraft protection was provided by two 7.7mm machine guns.

Early operational history
Due to their shallow draft, the Momi-class destroyers proved to be excellent for operation in coastal waters, and were used along the coast of China to support amphibious landings during the Second Sino-Japanese War.

A number of the Momi-class vessels were lost or disposed during the interwar period. Momi herself was turned over to trials in 1932, while Warabi was run down by the cruiser  on 27 August 1927 off Maizuru, Kyoto. Kaya and Nashi were scrapped in 1939.

Also in 1939, Aoi, Fuji, Hagi, Hishi, Kiku, Satsuki, Tade, Tsuta and Yomogi were removed from front line combat service and converted into patrol vessels. In 1940, Ashi, Kaki, Nine, Sumire, and Take were disarmed, and re-rated as training ships.

By the time of the Pacific War, the Momi-class was reaching the end of its service life, and only three (Tsuga, Hasu and Kuri) remained in service as destroyers. An effort was made to upgrade their capabilities by removing the minesweeping gear from the stern and replacing with 36 to 48 depth charges and four depth charge launchers.  The amidships Type 3 guns was replaced by two triple Type 96 AA guns from 1942 to 1943, and a Type 13 radar was added.  Tsuga was sunk by air attack 15 January 1945. Hasu was surrendered and scrapped at the end of the war. Kuri was surrendered, but sank after striking a mine off Korea on 8 October 1945.

As patrol boats

Their torpedo tubes, minesweeping gear, and the amidships Type 3 gun mount were replaced by six Type 96 25 mm AT/AA Guns, 36 depth charges, and three depth charge throwers. As well, their names were dropped and they were simply numbered.

During 1941–1942, these vessels were modified again, to carry and launch a Toku Daihatsu-class landing craft, by having the aft smokestack removed and the stern modified with a sloping deck to the waterline, as well as providing accommodation for 150 naval infantry troops. All of these vessels except ex-Fuji (as Patrol Boat #36) were sunk during the course of the Pacific War.

List of ships

Notes

References

Destroyer classes
 
World War II destroyers of Japan